Kokkedal is the municipal seat of Fredensborg Municipality and a northern settlement in the urban area of Hørsholm, located on the coastline of northern Zealand, Denmark, between the two towns, Nivå and Hørsholm, 30 km north of Copenhagen. The settlement is connected with the Oresundtrain towards Helsingør to the north and Copenhagen to the south, with extensions to Malmö and other major cities in southern Sweden.

History 
Kokkedal was previously the seat of Karlebo Kommune until the reform of the Danish Municipalities and Regions in 2007, as a result of the Municipal Reform in 2007 (Kommunalreformen (2007)).

Demographics 
Kokkedal has, like Nivå, a high number of second & third generation immigrants, most of them with Turkish or Arab roots.56% of the population are either immigrants or Danish citizens with immigrant parents and 44% are native Danes.

Notable people 

 Cecilia Iftikhar (born 1987 in Kokkedal) competitor in Miss Earth 2011

Sport 
 Michael Mørkøv (born 1985 in Kokkedal) a Danish professional racing cyclist
 Jesper Morkov (born 1988 in Kokkedal) a Danish male track and road cyclist
 Mads Valentin (born 1996 in Kokkedal) a footballer who plays for Swiss club FC Zürich
 Oliver Kjærgaard (born 1998 in Kokkedal) a Danish footballer

Municipal seats in the Capital Region of Denmark
Municipal seats of Denmark
Neighbourhoods in Denmark
Fredensborg Municipality